The Dayton Art Institute (DAI) is a museum of fine arts in Dayton, Ohio, United States. The Dayton Art Institute has been rated one of the top 10 best art museums in the United States for children. The museum also ranks in the top 3% of all art museums in North America in 3 of 4 factors. In 2007, the art institute saw 303,834 visitors.

History
Founded in a downtown mansion in 1919 as the Dayton Museum of Fine Arts, the museum moved to a newly designed Edward B. Green building in 1930. The DAI was modeled after the Casino in the gardens of the Villa Farnese at Caprarola, and the front hillside stairway after the Italian Renaissance garden stairs at the Villa d'Este, near Rome, and Italy. It is also visible from and easily accessible from I-75, which passes through the center of Dayton.

The museum was later renamed the Dayton Art Institute as an indication of the growing importance of its school in addition to the museum. The nearly  building is now listed on the National Register of Historic Places.

Museum information
The museum's collection contains more than 20,000 objects spanning 5,000 years. In September, 2005, the Museum became one of eleven galleries in the US to host The Quest for Immortality: Treasures of Ancient Egypt, the largest collection of ancient artifacts ever to travel outside Egypt.

The art museum is an Italian Renaissance–style building, which sits atop a hill overlooking downtown Dayton. The institute's highlights are the museum's Asian, 17th-century Baroque, 18th- and 19th-century American, and contemporary art collections. In addition to its collections, the museum frequently features other exhibitions.

Notable works
Some of the most notable works held by the institute are:

 The Song of the Nightingale by William-Adolphe Bouguereau
 Purple Leaves by Georgia O'Keeffe
 Cantata by Norman Lewis
 Untitled by Joan Mitchell
 Sea Change by Helen Frankenthaler
 Untitled by Louise Nevelson
 Louise Nevelson by Alison Van Pelt
 Lost and Found by Alison Saar
 Embroidery from Uzbekistan by Janet Fish
 Sawdy by Edward Kienholz
 Study Heads of an Old Man by Peter Paul Rubens
 High Noon by Edward Hopper
 Aurora Red Ikebana with Bright Yellow Stems by Dale Chihuly
 After the Bath by Edgar Degas
 Stacks in Celebration by Charles Sheeler
 Scene in Yosemite Valley by Albert Bierstadt
 Allegory of the Four Seasons by Bartolomeo Manfredi
 Water Lilies by Claude Monet
 American Indian Series (Russell Means) by Andy Warhol
 Homage to Painting by Roy Lichtenstein
 Shimmering Madness by Sandy Skoglund

Gallery

See also
 National Register of Historic Places listings in Dayton, Ohio

References

External links

 

1919 establishments in Ohio
Art museums established in 1919
Art museums and galleries in Ohio
Buildings and structures on the National Register of Historic Places in Ohio
Museums in Dayton, Ohio
National Register of Historic Places in Montgomery County, Ohio
Tourist attractions in Dayton, Ohio
Museums on the National Register of Historic Places
Green & Wicks buildings